Parkersburg South High School (also known as South) in Parkersburg, West Virginia, United States serves grades 9 through 12, and is part of the Wood County School District. 
The school's colors are navy blue and white (with a touch of scarlet), and the mascot is a Patriot. The school's principal is Betsy Patterson. As of the 2016-17 school year, the school has 1,859 students. The Wood County School District has 13,259 students in 29 schools. Feeder schools are Edison Middle School and Blennerhassett Middle School.

Academics
In 1989, Parkersburg South was named a WV Exemplary School by the WV Board of Education. In 1992, Parkersburg South was named a Blue Ribbon School by the WV Department of Education. PSHS was two time defending state champion in policy debate in 2004 and 2005. PSHS has also had success with other forms of debate, such as parliamentary and Lincoln-Douglas, as well as with the Forensic Speech team. Both the Forensics, and Debate teams have produced state finalists and champions. Several students have represented PSHS at the International Science and Engineering fair in addition to having had two Science Talent Search finalists and students ranking with top honors at both the state and national level Junior Science and Humanities Symposium. In 2007, a South student was selected for the Prudential Spirit of Community Award and in 2014, another student was highlighted nationally for the AXA Achievement Scholarship. PSHS consistently performs above state average on the West Virginia Educational Standards Test.

Continental Clarion
Parkersburg South has its own student-run newspaper called the Continental Clarion. New editions are published every nine weeks.

Athletics
Parkersburg South maintains successful sporting programs and has had many all state athletes, individual state champions and 22 team championships throughout its history. Parkersburg South also has one of the loudest and rowdiest student sections in the state for basketball games. The students are known as the "Southside Psychos".  Parkersburg South competes in the 5A division of the Ohio Valley Athletic Conference (OVAC), which is the largest organized high school athletic conference in the United States.

Erickson All Sports Facility
As one of the largest high schools in the state of West Virginia, Parkersburg South lacked a home stadium for many sporting events until a community effort begun in August 1993. The Erickson All-Sports Facility is managed by the EASF Development Corporation and is home to Parkersburg South football, soccer, tennis, and track.

Instrumental music

Instrumental department
The Parkersburg South Patriot Band has won awards.

Notable alumni
Steve Swisher, former Major League Baseball player
Jay Wolfe, U.S. Senate candidate
Chase Fieler, professional basketball player

See also 
 List of high schools in West Virginia
 Education in West Virginia

References

External links 
 The Parkersburg South High School web page.
 The Parkersburg South High School Online Newspaper.

Public high schools in West Virginia
Buildings and structures in Parkersburg, West Virginia
Educational institutions established in 1967
Schools in Wood County, West Virginia